Johnstown Christian School is a private Christian school in Hollsopple, Pennsylvania. It was founded in 1944 by a group of Mennonite families who were concerned about the spiritual growth and development of their children. The school was reorganized in 1973 as the Johnstown Christian School to better reflect the broader Christian community of the Johnstown area that was being served. The school serves children in PK3 through 12th grade.

Campus
The Holsopple campus is located in the Davidsville-Holsopple area of Somerset County, about two miles from Conemaugh Township High School.  The school facilities include:

two parking lots
one soccer field
two playgrounds
one gymnasium (also serving as the auditorium)
one library/multi-media room
one computer lab
individual classrooms for all the students from PK3 through 12th grade

Student body
The school's student body and faculty represent various Christian denominations, though the vast majority are Protestant. As a private school, JCS draws students from a wide geographic area, though most teachers and students reside in the Greater Johnstown area.

Johnstown Christian School accommodates about 300 students. The school is subdivided into three schools: elementary school (kindergarten through fifth grade), middle school (sixth through eighth grade), and high school (ninth through twelfth grade). The ratio of students to faculty at the school is about 6:1.

Athletics
Johnstown Christian School offers three main sports. Men have the option of basketball, cross country, and soccer on the junior high and varsity levels. Women have the option of basketball, cross country, and soccer on the same levels. JCS offers track and football, baseball and softball through a co-op  through Conemaugh Township. Cross country has become a successful program, with multiple runners advancing to state competitions.

JCS was a long-time member of the Allegheny Christian Athletic Association (ACAA), taking home men's and women's titles for both soccer and basketball.

Since 2005, JCS has been a member of the Pennsylvania Interscholastic Athletic Association (PIAA), and schedules most competitions against local public schools. JCS is now eligible to participate in district, regional, and state level competitions.

JCS rejoined the ACAA in 2021, once again taking home titles for both soccer and basketball.

References

External links
 http://www.johnstownchristianschool.org/
 http://www.acsi.org/

Christian schools in Pennsylvania
Private high schools in Pennsylvania
Nondenominational Christian schools in the United States
Private middle schools in Pennsylvania
Private elementary schools in Pennsylvania
1944 establishments in Pennsylvania